Toshi Seeger (born Toshi Aline Ohta; July 1, 1922 – July 9, 2013) was an American filmmaker, producer and environmental activist. A filmmaker who specialized in the subject of folk music, Toshi's credits include the 1966 film Afro-American Work Songs in a Texas Prison and the Emmy Award-winning documentary Pete Seeger: The Power of Song, released through PBS in 2007. In 1966, Seeger and her husband, folk-singer Pete Seeger, co-founded the Hudson River Sloop Clearwater, which seeks to protect the Hudson River and surrounding wetlands. Additionally, they co-founded the Clearwater Festival (officially known as The Great Hudson River Revival), a major music festival held annually at Croton Point Park in Westchester County, New York.

Personal life
Toshi Seeger was born Toshi Aline Ohta on July 1, 1922, in Munich. Her mother, Virginia Harper Berry, was an American originally from Washington, D.C., while her father, Takashi Ohta, was a Japanese exile from Shikoku. Her grandfather, who had translated Marxist writings into Japanese, had been ordered to leave Japan. However, Takashi Ohta took his father's place, as permitted under Japanese law at the time, and went into exile. He met Virginia Berry while traveling, and they married and lived in Munich. Toshi and her parents moved to the United States when she was six months old and she was raised in Greenwich Village and Woodstock, New York. She attended the Little Red School House in Manhattan and graduated from The High School of Music & Art in 1940.

She met her future husband, Pete Seeger, at a square dance in 1939. The couple married in 1943 with an engagement ring bought with money borrowed from Pete's grandmother. In 1949 they moved to a log cabin without running water or electricity, with a view of the Hudson River.  She has been credited as the foundation of Seeger's personal and professional success. Toshi, along with their children, went with Pete to his hearings before the House Un-American Activities Committee (HUAC) in Washington during the 1950s. Pete Seeger was cited for contempt of Congress in 1961, but his conviction was later overturned.

Career
Toshi Seeger helped to set up the Newport Folk Festival during the early 1960s. She has also been credited with helping to discover Mississippi John Hurt, a country blues musician, during the same era. In 1965, she took part in the march from Selma to Montgomery, Alabama. She developed a career as a filmmaker and producer, often focusing on folk music and musicians. Many of her films are preserved at the Library of Congress. In 1966, she released Afro-American Work Songs in a Texas Prison, which focused on the traditional songs sung by Texas prison inmates as they chopped down trees. 

When Pete Seeger's ban from television appearances for his political views was lifted in 1965, Toshi produced and directed a public television series, Rainbow Quest, hosted by her husband 1965 to 1966. Her official credited title for the show was "Chief Cook and Bottle Washer."

Toshi and Pete Seeger co-founded both the Hudson River Sloop Clearwater and its related musical offshoot, The Great Hudson River Revival, also known as the "Clearwater Festival". She used the festival to rally public support for cleaning up the Hudson River. Under her direction, the festival also instituted a number of ideas which were not utilized at other music festivals during the 1970s and 1980s, providing sign language interpreters, disabled-accessible wheelchair access, and recycling programs. She recruited up-and-coming musical artists to perform at the festival through its planning committee, including Tracy Chapman, before they achieved popularity elsewhere. The Clearwater Festival now attracts more than 15,000 attendees to Croton Point Park each summer.

Toshi Seeger executive produced the 2007 PBS documentary, Pete Seeger: The Power of Song, which won an Emmy Award. She was 85 years old at the time of the documentary's production. She served on numerous civic, environmental and artistic organizations, including the New York State Council on the Arts.

Death
Toshi Seeger died at her home in Beacon, New York, on July 9, 2013, at the age of 91, nine days before what would have been her 70th wedding anniversary. She was surrounded by her husband; their children Daniel, Mika and Tinya; six grandchildren, including singer Tao Rodríguez-Seeger; and one great-grandson. Pete Seeger died six months later, on January 27, 2014, at age 94.

References

External links

1922 births
2013 deaths
American documentary filmmakers
American environmentalists
American women environmentalists
American film producers
Music festival founders
Television producers from New York City
American women television producers
People from Beacon, New York
People from Greenwich Village
Seeger family
The High School of Music & Art alumni
American women documentary filmmakers
Little Red School House alumni
American people of Japanese descent
German emigrants to the United States
German people of Japanese descent